Coxtie Green is a small settlement in the Borough of Brentwood in Essex, England.

Hamlets in Essex
Borough of Brentwood